Poland competed at the 2016 European Athletics Championships in Amsterdam, Netherlands, from 6-10 July 2016. A delegation of 67 athletes were sent to represent the country.

Medals

Results

Men
Track & road events

Field events

Combined events – Decathlon

Women
Track & road events

Field events

Combined events – Heptathlon

References

European Athletics Championships
2016
Nations at the 2016 European Athletics Championships